Purusia acreana is a species of beetle in the family Cerambycidae. It was described by Lane in 1956. It is known from Brazil, Ecuador and Bolivia.

References

Hemilophini
Beetles described in 1956